Bathavon was a rural district in Somerset, England, from 1933 to 1974.

It was created in 1933 with the abolition of Bath Rural District and Keynsham Rural District.

In 1974 it was abolished under the Local Government Act 1972, becoming part of Wansdyke District which itself was abolished in 1996 with the creation of Bath and North East Somerset.

It contained the parishes of Bathampton, Batheaston, Bathford, Camerton, Charlcombe, Claverton, Combe Hay, Compton Dando, Corston, Dunkerton, Englishcombe, Freshford, Hinton Charterhouse, Kelston, Keynsham, Marksbury, Monkton Combe, Newton St Loe, North Stoke, Peasedown St John, Priston, Saltford, Shoscombe, South Stoke, St Catherine, Swainswick, Wellow, Weston and Whitchurch.

References
Bathavon Rural District at Vision of Britain
Local Government Act 1972

Districts of England abolished by the Local Government Act 1972
History of Somerset
Local government in Somerset
1933 establishments in England